A chloride channel opener is a type of drug which facilitates ion transmission through chloride channels.

An example is 1,10-phenanthroline, which activates Cystic fibrosis transmembrane conductance regulator (CFTR) chloride channels.

GABA-A receptor agonists (e.g. lorazepam) may also be considered chloride channel openers

See also 
 Chloride channel blocker

References

Further reading 

 
 

Ion channel openers
Membrane transport modulators